The al-Hasakah Governorate campaign was a multi-sided military conflict between Syrian government forces, Kurdish forces, armed Syrian opposition groups, and Salafist jihadist forces, including al-Qaeda's Islamic State of Iraq and the Levant and the al-Nusra Front in the al-Hasakah Governorate as part of the Syrian Civil War. The clashes began with the People's Protection Units (YPG)'s entrance into the civil war in July 2012 and spread across the governorate.

Background
As of 2011, the Hasakah Governorate had a population of more than 1.5 million people. It is one of the most diverse regions in Syria. The diverse population of the governorate includes Kurds, Arabs, Assyrians, Armenians, Turkmen, Circassians, and Yazidis. The Arab tribes in the area are divided into several tribal confederations which play a role in the civil war.

Anti-government protests had been ongoing in the Kurdish-inhabited areas of Syria since March 2011, as part of the wider Syrian uprising, but armed conflict in the region only started after the opposition Democratic Union Party (PYD) and Kurdish National Council (KNC) signed a seven-point agreement on 11 June 2012 in Erbil under the auspice of Iraqi Kurdistan president Massoud Barzani. This agreement, however, failed to be implemented. A new cooperation agreement between the two sides was signed on 12 July which saw the creation of the Kurdish Supreme Committee as a governing body of all Kurdish-controlled territories in Syria.

Order of battle

Pro-Kurdish Supreme Committee (DBK) forces 
 Democratic Union Party
People's Protection Units (YPG)
 Martyr Erdal Brigade
 Free Men of the Homeland
 Women's Protection Units
 Rukan Battalion
 Kurdistan Workers' Party (PKK)
 Syriac Union Party
 Syriac Military Council
 Sutoro
 Army of Dignity

Pro-government forces 
Syrian Armed Forces
 Syrian Army
 4th Armoured Division
 154th Brigade 
 Syrian Air Force
 National Defence Forces
 Ta'ie tribal militia 
 Abu Jabal Brigade
 Free Patriots Brigade
 Sootoro

Rebels 
 Al-Qaeda
  Al-Nusra Front
 
 Kurdish units
  Ahrar al-Sham
 Ahfad al-Rasul Brigades
 Ansar al-Khilafah of Aleppo
 Ansar al-Khilafah of al-Hasakah
 Liwa Amjad al-Islam
 Liwa al-Qadisiyah
 Kurdish Islamic Front
 Jaysh al-Tawhid (ex-Syrian Islamic Front group)
 Syrian Revolution General Commission
 313th Brigade
 Free Syrian Army
 Ahrar al-Jazeera
 Hamza Battalion
 Al-Jazeera–Euphrates Liberation Front (FAEL)
 Mashaal Tammo Brigade
 15th Infantry Division
 Al-Tawhid Brigade
 Ayad al-Fahri Battalion
 Farouq Brigades

The campaign

First week: YPG claims territory
On 20 July 2012, the YPG took control of the city of Amuda and established checkpoints outside it. The city fell without any major clashes, as the Syrian Army withdrew without any significant resistance and pulled out to fight elsewhere. A joint committee between the PYD and the KNC was planned to take over the administration of captured towns. The city of Derik was expected to be captured hours later. The goal of the KSC was the "full liberation of Syrian Kurdistan", restore peace and order, and to prevent the Free Syrian Army (FSA) from entering Kurdish-majority areas.

On the same day, the Kurdish Coordination Committees, a Kurdish opposition group, demanded Syrian security forces to withdraw from Qamishli, the largest city in Syria with a majority Kurdish population. "Otherwise, they will be forced to leave", the KCC threatened. The YPG then prepared for an operation in Qamishli.

On 21 July, the YPG entered Derik and clashes took place. On the same day, Syrian government forces attacked a patrol of YPG fighters and wounded one fighter. The next day it was reported that Kurdish forces were still fighting for al-Malikiyah, where a Kurdish activist was killed after government security forces opened fire on protesters. The YPG also took control over parts of the towns of Ras al-Ayn and al-Darbasiyah, after government security and political units withdrew from these areas, following an ultimatum issued by the Kurds. On the same day, clashes erupted in Qamishli between YPG and government forces in which one Kurdish fighter was killed and two were wounded along with a government official.

The ease with which Kurdish forces captured the towns and the government troops pulled back was speculated to be due to the government reaching an agreement with the Kurds so military forces from the area could be freed up to engage rebel forces in the rest of the country. However, Salih Muslim Muhammad, co-leader of the PYD, denied that there was any agreement between the PYD and the government. On 24 July, the PYD announced that Syrian security forces withdrew from the small Kurdish city of 16,000 of al-Ma'bada, located between al-Malikiyah and the Syria–Turkey border. The YPG forces afterwards took control of all government institutions in the town.

August–October 2012: YPG consolidates gains
On 2 August 2012, the National Coordination Committee for Democratic Change announced that most Kurdish-majority cities in Syria, with the exception of Qamishli and Hasaka, were no longer controlled by government forces and were now being governed by Kurdish political parties. In Qamishli, government military and police forces remained in their barracks and administration officials in the city allowed the Kurdish flag to be raised.

Later in August 2012, 6 military officers who defected from the Syrian Armed Forces, led by Colonel Hassan al-Abdullah, announced the formation of the "Revolutionary Military Council in Hasakah Governorate", part of the Free Syrian Army. On the same day, a FSA group called the "Believers in God Battalion" captured a police station on the road between Aleppo and Hasakah.

On 18 August, the government's intelligence center in Qamishli was bombed. The Hamza Battalion of the FSA claimed responsibility for the bombing. This caused concerns among Kurdish parties in Qamishli as they have refused to allow the FSA to enter Kurdish-majority areas.

On 30 September, a suicide bomber detonated a car bomb at the government intelligence center in Qamishli, killing between 4 and 8 people.

November 2012–January 2013: Islamists join the fight and the Battle of Ras al-Ayn

On 8 November 2012, Free Syrian Army groups attacked Syrian Army positions in Ras al-Ayn and took control of parts of the city. A correspondent on the ground said that local Kurds aided the FSA in the attack. 300 jihadist fighters from Ghuraba al-Sham then entered the city, although it did not enter the neighbourhoods controlled by the PYD and the latter did not intervene in the clashes between the rebels and the government. Around 10-26 rebels and 20 Syrian soldiers were killed in the fighting, while about 8,000 residents fled to Ceylanpınar as fighting raged.

On 10 November, YPG militiamen aided by local Kurds stormed the last government security and administrative stations in the towns of al-Darbasiyah and Tel Tamer. This attack was prompted by violence in Ras al-Ayn where the FSA and Islamist rebels stormed the town because of the presence of government security units. 12 November, the PYD forced the last Syrian government forces to withdraw from Derik.

On 15 November, the rebels led by al-Qaeda's al-Nusra Front announced that they had taken full control of Ras al-Ayn, capturing or killing the last remaining Syrian Army soldiers stationed there. There were also no government airstrikes in the town for the first time in three days, as government forces gave up trying to retake the city. Al-Nusra Front fighters summarily executed dozens of Syrian soldiers after they captured a border outpost near Ras al-Ayn. Inside the town, al-Nusra implemented Sharia and burned a liquor store. This caused a confrontation with the YPG.

On 19 November, the Islamist rebels launched an assault on the PYD in Ras al-Ayn A rebel sniper also assassinated Abed Khalil, the president of the local PYD council. By the next, SOHR reported that the death toll in the rebel-PYD fighting in the town had reached 34. The opposition activist group Local Coordination Committees of Syria put the number of deaths at 46. Also on 19 November, members of the al-Nusra Front and Ghuraba al-Sham opened fire on a YPG checkpoint, sparking clashes that killed dozens of people. The rebels planned to launch an offensive in Qamishli, but were stopped by the Assyrian Democratic Organization. Meanwhile, pro-government Arab tribes in Qamishli organized themselves into the Popular Committees and clashed with the PYD.

As a result of the fighting, there was a buildup in the number of forces deployed by both sides in Ras al-Ayn. By 22 November, Kurdish forces had strengthened their numbers to around 400 militiamen, who faced 200 fighters from the al-Nusra Front and 100 fighters from Ghuraba al-Sham. By the same day, the fighting killed more than 54 people. The next day, however, a tenuous two-day ceasefire was announced between Kurdish fighters and the al-Nusra Front and Ghuraba al-Sham in order to determine terms of a possible permanent agreement between the two sides. Prior to this announcement, the PYD claimed that its forces had killed 25 rebels.

Negotiations between the two sides on 4 December resulted in a fragile truce that lasted only until 6 December, when clashes broke out again. From 12 to 14 December, rebels conducted a series of rocket attacks on the town. It was reported that they had also tried and failed to expand fighting to the nearby towns and villages.

Negotiations between the Arab rebels and Kurds resumed on 15 December. An agreement was reached the next day. On 17 December, a ceasefire came into effect between local Kurdish militias and Arab rebels. Under the terms of the ceasefire, both sides were to withdraw from the city, share checkpoints surrounding it, and transfer its administration to local civilian Kurds, Arabs, Chechens, and Christians. Though fighting ended, fighters on both sides failed to withdraw, raising concerns about the strength of the truce.

Fighting in Ras al-Ayn resumed on 17 January 2013. By 22 January, more than 56 people were killed in a week of fighting in Ras al-Ayn.

February 2013: al-Qaeda launches new offensive, ceasefire between YPG and FSA

On 12 February 2013, the al-Nusra Front launched an offensive on the Syrian Army in the town of al-Shaddadah in the southern Hasaka Governorate. 2 days later, al-Nusra took full control of the town and killed around 100 Syrian soldiers.

On 18 February, an agreement was reached between the Kurdish Supreme Committee and FSA groups in Ras al-Ayn. The terms of agreement include the withdrawal of all foreign fighters from Ras al-Ayn, joint checkpoints between the YPG and the FSA, the establishment of a joint city council in Ras al-Ayn, the creation of a local police force, and cooperation between the two groups to fight the Syrian government.

March 2013: YPG take control of oil fields

In March 2013, the YPG surrounded Syrian forces in Rmelan and al-Qahtaniya and took control of the towns without firing a shot. The YPG also took over the oil fields in the area. Meanwhile, further south, multiple rebel groups including Ahrar al-Jazeera, the al-Nusra Front, Ghuraba al-Sham, and Ahrar al-Sham captured the town of al-Yaarubiyah on the Iraq–Syria border. In Qamishli, the PYD controlled 40% of the city while the government controlled the remaining parts. Meanwhile, clashes between rebels and the Syrian Army erupted in Tell Hamis.

April 2013: renewed YPG-government clashes in Qamishli, concurrent rebel offensive
On 5 April 2013, 3 YPG fighters and 3 Syrian soldiers were killed in clashes in Qamishli city. This marked the first time that Syrian government forces attacked the YPG in Qamishli for several months.

On 13 April, the Syrian Revolution General Commission's 313th Brigade declared the start of a rebel offensive south of Qamishli. The rebels launched an attack on the Syrian Army's 154th Brigade base in southern Qamishli. Both the PYD and the KNC stated their intentions to prevent fighting in the city, but according to al-Akhbar, the rebels contacted the YPG and were given a pathway to attack the base. In response to the rebel offensive, the Syrian Air Force conducted airstrikes on rebel-held villages south of Qamishli. Fighting also reached Qamishli Airport. The battle was described as a "massacre" by UNICEF.

May–September 2013: YPG fully capture Ras al-Ayn; further YPG gains
In June 2013, clashes between the PYD and anti-PYD protesters took place in Amuda. Opponents of the PYD stated that fighters had opened fire on protesters following tensions with pro-Free Syrian Army youth committees and rival Kurdish groups. The PYD on the other hand stated it had been attacked by a mercenary gang.

On 17 July, Kurdish fighters expelled the remaining jihadists of the al-Nusra Front and the Islamic State of Iraq and the Levant from Ras al-Ayn after a night of fighting and soon after took control of the border crossing with Turkey. Islamist forces retreated from Ras al-Ayn to Tal Half, Asfar and Najar, which were under rebel control.

On 19 July, the YPG captured the village of Tal A'lo. Fighting was still continuing in Karhouk and A'li Agha. The next day, Kurdish fighters captured an al-Nusra checkpoint near the contested villages. By this point, 35 jihadists and 19 YPG fighters had been killed in the fighting.

At the end of August 2013, the Syrian Air Force conducted an airstrike on the PYD-held town of Derik.

October–December 2013: YPG capture border town; ISIL offensives

In October 2013, Ahrar al-Jazeera was expelled from the border town of al-Yaarubiyah by the al-Nusra Front, the Islamic State of Iraq and the Levant, and other Salafist jihadist groups. At the end of the month, YPG forces supported by local Arab tribes and Iraq captured Yarubiya from the jihadists after a 4-day battle.

From October to December 2013, ISIL conducted a campaign of suicide bombings on both YPG and Syrian government's National Defence Forces in Qamishli. Meanwhile, fighting between the YPG and ISIL, supported by al-Nusra and Ahrar al-Sham, escalated in the countryside of Qamishli.

See also
Raqqa campaign (2012–2013)

Notes

References

Works cited 
 

Military operations of the Syrian civil war in 2012
Military operations of the Syrian civil war in 2013
Military operations of the Syrian civil war involving the People's Protection Units
Military operations of the Syrian civil war involving the al-Nusra Front
Military operations of the Syrian civil war involving the Syrian government
Military operations of the Syrian civil war involving the Free Syrian Army
Al-Hasakah Governorate in the Syrian civil war
Military operations of the Syrian civil war involving the Islamic State of Iraq and the Levant